The National Basketball League (NBL) Championship was the final series for the NBL and the conclusion of its postseason. The championship series were played in varying best-of-three or best-of-five formats. From 1937–38 to 1939–40, and again from 1944–45 to 1948–49, the championship series pitted the winners from the Eastern Division against the winners from the Western Division. However, due to fewer teams in the league caused by World War II, the NBL was not separated into divisions between 1940–41 and 1943–44, therefore the playoffs included the top four teams in the single-division league. Home court advantage was determined by better overall record heading into the championship series.

Three teams are tied with the most NBL championships at two each – the Akron Firestone Non-Skids (1939, 1940), Oshkosh All-Stars (1941, 1942), and Fort Wayne Zollner Pistons (1944, 1945). The Oshkosh All-Stars have the most championship appearances of any team with six, followed by the Sheboygan Red Skins' five appearances.

Champions
 The brackets in the Western champion, Eastern champion, Higher seed, and Lower seed columns indicate the number of times that teams have appeared in an NBL Championship as well as each respective team's NBL Championship record to date.

1938 to 1940

1941 to 1944

1945 to 1949

See also
 List of NBA champions

References
General

Specific

External links
 NBL yearly standings – Association of Professional Basketball Research

 
Champions
National Basketball League (United States)